The Royal Navy Chaplaincy Service provides chaplains to the Royal Navy. The chaplains are commissioned by the Sovereign but do not hold military rank other than that of "Chaplain Royal Navy". They are usually addressed as Padre, Reverend or more informally Bish. Chaplains are recruited from a number of Christian denominations.

The senior chaplain in the Royal Navy is the Chaplain of the Fleet (Chp FLT) Andrew Hillier: an Anglican priest, he is also the Archdeacon for the Royal Navy.

Training
Chaplains join the Royal Navy as experienced clergy of their denomination.  They undergo naval training at Britannia Royal Naval College alongside other Royal Navy officer cadets. Those serving with the Royal Marines may be selected to attempt commando training: if successful they become Royal Navy Commandos and wear the Commando green beret and, on No 1 uniform, the Commando Dagger badge.  Those who serve with the Submarine Service may earn their submarine service "Dolphins".

Chaplains of the Fleet

The role of Chaplain of the Fleet, being Head of the Naval Chaplains, was established on 13 May 1859, and was originally attached to the role of Senior Chaplain at Greenwich Hospital and was also the Inspector of Naval Schools.
An Order in Council issued by King Edward VII in August 1902 granted the ecclesiastical dignity of archdeacon on the Chaplain of the Fleet.
Thomas Ken was appointed Chaplain of the Fleet by King Charles II in 1683.

 

 1859–1865: Unknown
 1865–1871: William Guise-Tucker
 1871–1876: Unknown
 23 November 18761882 (retd): John Cawston
 1882–1888: John Harbord
 188817 January 1899 (retd): John Cox-Edwards
 18991 March 1901 (retd): John Berry
 19016 October 1906 (retd): Stuart Harris
 19061 December 1917 (retd): Hugh Wood
 1917–1924: Charles Ingles
 192429 January 1929 (retd): Robert McKew
 1929–1933: Walter Knight-Adkin
 1933–1935: Charles Peshall
 19354 October 1938 (retd): Arthur Gilbertson
 1938–1943: Thomas Crick
 1943–1947: John Wilson
 194715 May 1952: Leonard Coulshaw
 1952–1956: Noel Chamberlain
 1956–1960: Darrell Bunt
 19605 March 1963 (retd): John Armstrong
 15 May 196318 March 1966 (retd): Raymond Richardson
 18 March 19666 May 1969: Christopher Prior
 8 April 19699 June 1972 (retd): Ambrose Weekes
 14 April 19721975: Chandos Morgan
 4 December 19751980: Basil O'Ferrall
 28 March 19801984: Raymond Roberts
 11 June 19841989: Noël Jones
 1989–1994: Michael Henley
 1994–1997: Michael Bucks
 1997–1999: Simon Golding
 1999–2000: Charles Stewart
 2000–2002: Simon Golding
 2002–2006: Barry Hammett
 2006–2010: John Green
 2010–2014: Scott J. Brown
 2014–2018: Ian Wheatley
 2018–2021: Martyn Gough
22 June 2021present: Andrew Hillier

See also
Royal Air Force Chaplains Branch
Royal Army Chaplains' Department

References

Further reading

 Bergen, Doris. L., (ed), 2004. The Sword of the Lord: Military Chaplains from the First to the Twenty-First Century. University of Notre Dame Press

External links
RN Chaplaincy Services - Royal Navy official website

 
Military supporting service occupations
Organisations based in Portsmouth
Religion in Hampshire
Religion in the military
Religion in the United Kingdom
Religious occupations